Žerjav is a settlement on the Meža River northeast of Črna na Koroškem in the Carinthia region in northern Slovenia.

References

External links

Žerjav on Geopedia

Populated places in the Municipality of Črna na Koroškem